Idealists in Distress From Bristol is a live performance anthology album by English post-punk band The Pop Group, released in 2007.

Track listing

Personnel 
Adapted from the Idealists in Distress From Bristol liner notes.
 Dan Catsis – bass guitar
 Gareth Sager – saxophone, clarinet, piano, organ, guitar, mastering
 Bruce Smith – drums, percussion
 Mark Stewart – vocals
 Simon Underwood – bass guitar
 John Waddington – guitar, bass guitar

Release history

References 

2007 live albums
The Pop Group albums